The 1979 All-Ireland Senior Football Championship was the 93rd staging of the All-Ireland Senior Football Championship, the Gaelic Athletic Association's premier inter-county Gaelic football tournament. The championship began on 13 May 1979 and ended on 16 September 1979.

Kerry entered the championship as the defending champions.

On 16 September 1979, Kerry won the championship following a 3-13 to 1-8 defeat of Dublin in the All-Ireland final. This was their 25th All-Ireland title and their second in succession.

Kerry's Mikey Sheehy was the championship's top scorer with 6-18. He was also named as the Texaco Footballer of the Year.

Leinster Championship format change

The second round of the Leinster football championship is dropped this year after 1 year.

Results

Connacht Senior Football Championship

Quarter-finals

Semi-finals

Final

Leinster Senior Football Championship

First round

 

Quarter-finals

 

 

Semi-finals

Final

Munster Senior Football Championship

Quarter-finals

Semi-finals

Final

Ulster Senior Football Championship

Preliminary round

Quarter-finals

Semi-finals

Final

All-Ireland Senior Football Championship

Semi-finals

Final

Championship statistics

Top scorers

Overall

Single game

Miscellaneous

 Monaghan's 1-15 to 0-11 defeat of Donegal in the Ulster final gave them their first provincial title since 1938.
 Roscommon in the Connacht final for the third year in a row only time a team not Galway/Mayo and ever done so.
 As Dublin win their sixth Leinster title in a row they follow Wexford (1913-1918) and Kildare (1926-1931) who previously done so.

References